Enzersfeld is a town in the district of Korneuburg in the state of Lower Austria in Austria.

Geography
Enzersfeld lies in the Weinviertel in Lower Austria east of Korneuburg. About 4 percent of the municipality is forested.

References

External links
 Enzersfeld Homepage

Cities and towns in Korneuburg District